In statistics, the order of a kernel is the degree of the first non-zero moment of a kernel.

Definitions 
The literature knows two major definitions of the order of a kernel:

Definition 1 
Let  be an integer. Then,  is a kernel of order  if the functions  are integrable and satisfy

Definition 2

References

Nonparametric statistics